Tony Caterina (born March 28, 1956 in Montagano, Italy) is a Canadian businessman and politician who has served on the Edmonton City Council since 2007. He formerly represented Ward 7 from 2010-2021. In 2021, he ran in the new constituency of O-Day’min however he lost to newcomer Urban Planner Anne Stevenson by over 3,000 votes. Provincially, Tony Caterina ran for election as the Progressive Conservative candidate in the riding of Edmonton-Beverly-Clareview and lost in the May 5, 2015 election to NDP incumbent Deron Bilous.

Early life
Tony Caterina was born in Italy. His family moved to Canada in 1962 and settled in Edmonton, Alberta. He began an education degree at the University of Alberta, but ultimately majored in history.

Caterina founded three clothing stores in 1974 and later founded a local industrial pipe insulation company. He became involved in civic politics as a member of the Board of Directors for the Alberta Avenue Business Association.

Political career
Tony Caterina was seeking election to be the MLA in the Edmonton-Beverly-Clareview riding and lost in the May 5, 2015 election.

Caterina ran for a seat on Edmonton's municipal council as a candidate in the 2004 Edmonton municipal election in Ward 3.

Caterina ran for a seat to the Legislative Assembly of Alberta in the electoral district of Edmonton-Centre in the 2004 Alberta general election.

After another failed bid for a seat in the Legislative Assembly of Alberta, Caterina was disqualified from running in future Alberta elections due to an $11,000 campaign deficit that he was unable to pay back.

First term
Caterina ran for Edmonton municipal council a second time in the 2007 Edmonton municipal election. He took the seat in an eight-way race for Ward 6.

Caterina attempted to keep Edmonton Centre Airport CYXD from being closed. He has been a fiscal conservative on council encouraging the city to exercise budgetary restraint. He serves as a representative for the City of Edmonton as a member of the Board of Directors for Northlands since being elected in 2007.

Second term
Following the change in electoral boundaries, Caterina ran for a second term in office in Ward 7 in the 2010 Edmonton municipal election. Although Tony's campaign signs were targeted and marked by graffiti artists in 2010, he won his campaign for Ward 7.

Third term
Caterina was reelected in Ward 7  October 2013.

References

External links

1956 births
Living people
Alberta Alliance Party candidates in Alberta provincial elections
Edmonton city councillors
University of Alberta alumni
Italian emigrants to Canada